Emerich (Imre) Vogl (born 12 August 1905 in Temesvár, Austria-Hungary (now Romania) – died 29 October 1971 in Bucharest, Romania) was a Romanian football player and coach of Banat Swabian ethnicity who was a member of Romanian team which participated at the 1930 FIFA World Cup in Uruguay and 1934 FIFA World Cup in Italy.

Career

Club career 

Emerich Vogl played as a youth for Chinezul Timișoara between 1921 and 1922. In 1922, at 17, Vogl made his debut for the senior team. He played for the first team of Chinezul until 1929, winning five times Liga I with his team. In 1929, together with his teammate Ladislau Raffinsky moved to Juventus București . They won their unique title of champions with Juventus in their first season played in Bucharest. Vogl played for Juventus until his retirement from his playing career, in 1940.

National Team 

Emmerich Vogl played for the Romania national football team between 1924 and 1934. His first match for the national team was a defeat against Czechoslovakia, in a friendly which took place in August 1924. In his third match for the national team, Vogl was named the team captain. Like Ladislau Raffinsky, his teammate at Juventus București, he scored his first and only goal for Romania in the last match before the 1930 FIFA World Cup, against Greece. In 1930, he was called to the Romanian squad which participated at the first FIFA World Cup, in Uruguay. But the chairman of Astra Romana, a company where Vogl and his teammate Ladislau Raffinsky were office workers, interdicted the two players to leave their workplace. At the intervention of Octav Luchide, the two players eventually took the SS Conte Verde ship to Uruguay. In Uruguay, Vogl played in both matches for Romania, against Peru and Uruguay. In 1934, he was picked up for the Romanian squad which participated at the 1934 FIFA World Cup. He played in the match against Czechoslovakia, the unique match played by Romania at this World Cup. This match was also the last match of Emerich Vogl at the national team.

International goals

After retirement 

After his retirement from the playing career, Vogl was named, in 1942, the manager of Juventus București. He was the manager of the team where he played for eleven years until 1949. He was also the manager of Romania national football team four times : between 1942 and 1945, for a short period in 1947, again in 1948, and the last time between 1950 and 1951. Between 1963 and 1967, he was a consultant for Rapid București, and then, until his death, he was also a consultant at the national team, helping Romania to qualify in 1970 at a FIFA World Cup after 32 years.

Honours

Player 
Chinezul Timișoara
Liga I (4): 1923–24, 1924–25, 1925–26, 1926–27
Juventus București
Liga I (1): 1929–30

References and notes

External links 

1905 births
1971 deaths
Sportspeople from Timișoara
People from the Kingdom of Hungary
Romanian sportspeople of Hungarian descent
Romanian people of German descent
Romanian footballers
Romania international footballers
Liga I players
FC Petrolul Ploiești players
Romanian football managers
Romania national football team managers
FC Petrolul Ploiești managers
1930 FIFA World Cup players
1934 FIFA World Cup players
Association football defenders
Association football midfielders